Yanakie may refer to:
 Yanakie Isthmus in south Gippsland, Victoria, Australia, connecting Wilsons Promontory to the mainland
 Yanakie, Victoria, a town on the isthmus